Jang Ji-won (born August 30, 1979) is a South Korean Taekwondo practitioner who competed at the 2004 Summer Olympics.

She won the gold medal in the 57 kg division.

External links
 profile

1979 births
Living people
South Korean female taekwondo practitioners
Olympic taekwondo practitioners of South Korea
Taekwondo practitioners at the 2004 Summer Olympics
Olympic gold medalists for South Korea
Olympic medalists in taekwondo
Medalists at the 2004 Summer Olympics
World Taekwondo Championships medalists
21st-century South Korean women